"I Will Return" is a pop song written by Joe Camilleri, Jeff Burstin and Tony Faehse and recorded by Australian blues, rock and R&B band Jo Jo Zep & The Falcons. The song was released in October 1980 as the third and final single from the band's fifth studio album Hats Off Step Lively (1980).

A limited edition of the single included a bonus 7" of two live tracks. The song peaked at number 91 on the Kent Music Report in Australia.

Track listing 
7" (K 8086) 
Side A "I Will Return" - 3:17
Side B "I Will Return"  (Live Version: Recorded at The Bottom Line, New York)  - 3:27

7" (K 8086 - Limited Edition) 
Side A "I Will Return" - 3:17
Side B "I Will Return"  (Live Version)  - 3:27
Side C "Don't Wanna Come Down"  (Live Version: Recorded at Montreaux Jazz Festival)  - 3:27
Side D "I Need Your Loving"  (Live Version: Recorded at Montreaux Jazz Festival)  - 8:40

Charts

References 

1980 songs
1980 singles
Mushroom Records singles
Songs written by Joe Camilleri
Jo Jo Zep & The Falcons songs